Metachrostis is a genus of moths of the family Erebidae first described by Jacob Hübner in 1820.

Taxonomy
The genus has previously been classified in the Eublemminae subfamily of Erebidae or the Acontiinae subfamily of the family Noctuidae.

Description
Palpi long and upturned, reaching above vertex of head. Thorax and abdomen tuftless. Forewings with stalked veins 8,9 and 10. Vein 7 sometimes almost or quite touching vein 8, and forming an areole.

Species

References

 Amsel (1935). Veröffentlichungen aus dem Deutschen Kolonial und Übersee Museum in Bremen 1(2): 237.
 Boisduval (1840). Genera et Index Methodicus Europaeorum Lepidopterorum: 96.
 Brandt (1938). Entomologische Rundschau 55: 558.
 Draudt (1950). Mitteilungen der Münchener Entomologischen Gesellschaft 40: 130.
 Hampson (1891). Illustration typical specimens of Lepidoptera Heterocera in the collection of the British Museum 8: 12, 73, Pl. 145: 16.
 Hübner (1813). Sammlung Europäischer Schmetterlinge 4(1): 515, Pl. 108.
 Kononenko, V.S. & Matov, A.Y. (2009). "A review of Palaearctic Metachrostis Hübner, [1820] 1816 with description of three new species (Lepidoptera: Noctuidae, Eublemminae)." Zootaxa 2026: 1–17.
 Moore (1881). Proceedings of the Zoological Society of London 1881: 371.
 Osthelder (1933). Mitteilungen der Münchener Entomologischen Gesellschaft 23(2): 85.
 Staudinger (1892). Deutsche Entomologische Zeitschrift, Gesellschaft Iris zu Dresden 5: 288.
 Warren (1912). Novitates Zoologicae 19: 36.

Boletobiinae
Noctuoidea genera